Wilhelm Giesbrecht (1854–1913) was a Prussian zoologist, specialising in copepods, during the "golden age of copepodology".

Giesbrecht was born in Gdańsk in 1854, and was educated in Kiel, where in 1881 he earned a Ph.D. in Baltic copepods under Professor Karl Möbius. He then moved to Naples to work at the zoological station there, staying there for the remainder of his life. His most famous work is the 1892 monograph Systematik und Faunistik der pelagischen Copepoden des Golfes von Neapel und der angrenzenden Meeres-Abschnitte ("Systematics and faunistics of the pelagic copepods of the Gulf of Naples and neighbouring seas"). In 1904, at the request of Anton Dohrn, Giesbrecht was made an honorary professor. He is commemorated in a number of species names:

Prostheceraeus giesbrechtii Lang, 1884
Buntonia giesbrechti (G. W. Müller, 1894)
Onchocorycaeus giesbrechti (F. Dahl, 1894)
Stenhelia giesbrechti T. & A. Scott, 1896
Pseudocyclopia giesbrechti Wolfenden, 1902
Xanthocalanus giesbrechti I. C. Thompson, 1903
Aetideus giesbrechti (Cleve, 1904)
Arietellus giesbrechti G. O. Sars, 1905
Conchoecetta giesbrechti (G. W. Müller, 1906)
Paramphiascopsis giesbrechti (G. O. Sars, 1906)
Harpacticus giesbrechti Klie, 1927
Pseudoclausia giesbrechti Bocquet & Stock, 1960
Candacia giesbrechti Grice & Lawson, 1977
Schoenocaulon ghiesbreghtii Greenman, Proc. Amer. Acad. Arts. 43: 20. 1907

Link to a Wilhelm Giesbrecht image gallery with examples of his illustrations of copepods
 http://gallery.obs-vlfr.fr/gallery2/v/Aquaparadox/album319/

References

1854 births
1913 deaths
German carcinologists
19th-century German zoologists
University of Kiel alumni
20th-century German zoologists